King of Texas is a 2002 American Western television film based on William Shakespeare's King Lear and directed by Uli Edel.

Plot
The film takes the plot of William Shakespeare's King Lear and places it in the Republic of Texas during the 19th century. Patrick Stewart stars as John Lear, a wealthy cattle baron and analog to King Lear. In the story, Lear divides his property among his daughters, only to be rejected by the eldest two of them once they have it.

Cast
Patrick Stewart as John Lear (King Lear)
Marcia Gay Harden as Mrs. Susannah Lear Tumlinson (Goneril)
Lauren Holly as Mrs. Rebecca Lear Highsmith (Regan)
Roy Scheider as Henry Westover (Earl of Gloucester)
David Alan Grier as Rip (amalgam of Earl "Caius" of Kent and The Fool)
Colm Meaney as Henry Tumlinson (Duke of Albany)
Patrick Bergin as Mr. Highsmith (Duke of Cornwall)
Matt Letscher as Emmett Westover (Edmund of Gloucester)
Liam Waite as Thomas Westover (Edgar of Gloucester)
Steven Bauer as Menchaca (King of France)
Julie Cox as Claudia Lear (Cordelia)
Richard Lineback as Warnell (Oswald)
Roger Cudney as Smithwick

Awards and nominations
Satellite Award
Nominated, Best Performance by an Actor in a Miniseries or a Motion Picture Made for Television - Patrick Stewart
Nominated, Best Performance by an Actor in a Supporting Role in a Series, Miniseries or a Motion Picture Made for Television - Roy Scheider
Nominated, Best Performance by an Actress in a Miniseries or a Motion Picture Made for Television - Marcia Gay Harden

Western Heritage Awards
Won, Best Television Feature Film

References

External links
 
 
 

2002 television films
2002 films
2002 Western (genre) films
American Western (genre) television films
Films based on King Lear
Films directed by Uli Edel
Films set in Texas
Films shot in Mexico
Modern adaptations of works by William Shakespeare
TNT Network original films
2000s English-language films